Newton College is a Peruvian British co-educational private school in Lima, Peru. It was founded in 1979 with the purpose of offering a modern, humanistic, technological education, combining academic excellence, sound character formation, and a sense of service to the community. It was to be British in outlook but with an international philosophy.

It is a semi-immersion, bilingual school delivering 50% of the curriculum in English and 50% in Spanish up to Year 3. As students progress through the school more of the curriculum is taught in English and for the IB Diploma Programme students may study five of their six chosen courses in English. Newton College was the first school in Peru to deliver the International Baccalaureate curriculum. It offers all its students the Primary Years Programme (2-11 year olds), the Middle Years Programme (11-16 year-olds), and the Diploma Programme (16-18 years olds).

The curriculum gives equal importance to all subjects and all three creative arts (Music, Drama and Visual Art) are taught to all students up to Year 8, when they become optional courses. All students learn to play a musical instrument from the age of 5. The school also offers a wide range of extra-curricular activities: community service projects, all major sports, Drama Club, Model United Nations, debating, gardening, scouts, etc.  

Newton College has approximately 1560 students, 85% of whom are Peruvian. It is located in an 11 hectare campus next to a lake in the leafy suburb of la Molina.  It has facilities, extensive sports fields and beautiful gardens. In addition, the school owns a large plot of land in the Amazon Rainforest, in district of Tambopata (Madre de Dios), where there is a purpose-built study centre that allows secondary- aged students to study the different ecosystems and collect data for their IBDP Geography and Biology investigations; university students may apply to do postgraduate research at the centre.

In 2006, the British newspaper, The Guardian Weekly, listed it as "one of the eight leading British-style, bilingual, international schools in the world".

It is a member of the British Schools of Peru (bsp.edu.pe), the Latin American Heads Conference (www.lahc.net) and the Global Alliance for Innovative Learning (www.gailschools.org)

The House System
At Newton College students are divided into four houses that compete throughout the year in academic, cultural and sports activities such as football, volleyball, rugby, swimming, cross country, chess, quizzes, scavenge, debates, among others, in order to obtain the school shield. The four houses are Lancaster, Tudor, Windsor, and York, named after the British royal houses.

Notable alumni
Claudia Llosa, film director, writer and producer, nominated for Best Foreign Language film
Nicolas Pacheco, sport shooter, competed in the 2012 Summer Olympics.

References

External links
Newton College Official School Website
ADCA Association of Private Schools in Peru

Private schools in Peru
Educational institutions established in 1979
1979 establishments in Peru